Västermyckeläng (Elfdalian: Westermykklaingg) is a locality situated in Älvdalen Municipality, Dalarna County, Sweden with 279 inhabitants in 2010.

The name comes from that the village and its meadows (äng) is located on the west (väster) side of Myckeln. Myckeln was the local name of Österdal River, it is now the lake that is the reservoir for the dam in Väsa. Locally the village is called Västäng.

References 

Populated places in Dalarna County
Populated places in Älvdalen Municipality